The Battle of Grand Coteau (North Dakota) or the Battle of Grand Coteau du Missouri was a battle fought between Métis buffalo hunters of Red River and the Sioux in North Dakota between July 13 and 14, 1851. The Métis were victorious. It was the last major battle between the two groups.

The buffalo hunt was a yearly event for the Métis of the Red River Colony. After sowing their fields in the spring they set out with their wives and children leaving the aged and infirm to take care of the crop. Their principal settlement was situated on the banks of the Red River of the North in what is now the city of Winnipeg, Manitoba, Canada.
Made up largely of French Métis they would leave for the summer buffalo hunt around the middle of June and returned in the middle of August with their pemmican and other dried meats. Often harassed by the Sioux, the Métis from the various settlements of Red River traveled in large groups for defence.

The battle

The 1851 buffalo hunt initially proceeded as follows. The St. Boniface group made rendezvous with the Pembina group on June 16 then traveled west to meet the St. François Xavier group (June 19).
There were 1,300 people, 1,100 carts and 318 hunters in the combined groups. The groups hunted separately but planned to unite against any threat from the Sioux.

The St. François Xavier (White Horse Plain) group led by Jean Baptiste Falcon, son of Pierre Falcon, and accompanied by its missionary, Father Louis-François Richer Laflèche numbered 200 carts and 67 hunters plus women and children. In North Dakota on the Grand Coteau of the Missouri on July 12 the scouts of St. François Xavier spotted a large band of Sioux. The five scouts riding back to warn the camp met with a party of 20 Sioux who surrounded them. Two made a run for it under fire but 3 were kept as captives. Two would escape the next day and one killed. On Sunday July 13 the camp was attacked by the Sioux.

Lafleche dressed in a black cassock, white surplice, and stole, directed with the camp commander Jean Baptiste Falcon a  miraculous defense against 2,000 Sioux combatants, holding up a crucifix during the battle. After a siege of two days (July 13 and 14), the Sioux withdrew, convinced that the Great Spirit protected the Métis.

The Missouri Coteau, or Missouri Plateau, is a plateau that stretches along the eastern side of the valley of the Missouri River in central North Dakota and north-central South Dakota in the United States and extends into Saskatchewan and Alberta in Canada. The Coteau du Missouri can also refer to a line of rolling hills on the eastern edge of the Missouri Plateau.

See also
List of battles fought in North Dakota
Métis buffalo hunt
Dakota War of 1862
Sioux Wars
Red River Trails
Second Battle of Adobe Walls
Battle of the Little Big Horn

References

External links
Metis Bison Hunters (Canadian Museum of Civilization)
Paul Kane (Artist as Buffalo hunter)
The Bison Hunt (The Many Uses of the Bison)
Portrait of Chief Medicine Bear 1872

Hunting
Indigenous peoples of the Great Plains
Native American history of North Dakota
Grand Coteau (North Dakota)
1851 in the United States
Grand Coteau
Métis in the United States
Grand Coteau
Pre-statehood history of North Dakota
July 1851 events
Grand Coteau (North Dakota)
Grand Coteau